Georgios Dasios (born 12 May 1983) is a Greek former professional footballer who played as a right-back.

Career
Born in Ioannina, Dasios has spent his entire career playing for local side PAS Giannina and was elected team captain. By the end of the 2014/15 season, he completed 299 appearances with PAS. Throughout his career, Dasios scored 11 goals. His contract expired on 30 June 2015 as it wasn't renewed.

On 6 August 2015 Dasios signed a contract with Olympiakos Volou. He played nine times in the league and made one appearance in the cup.

On 29 January 2016 he signed a contract with Lamia.

On 29 June 2016 he signed a contract with Apollon Smyrni. On 2 January 2018 he was released from Apollon Smyrni. Three days later he joined Panachaiki on a one-and-a-half-year contract.

Post retirement
After he retired from playing, Dasios returned to PAS Giannina as Director of Football.

References

External links
Profile at epae.org
Profile at Onsports.gr
 Guardian Football 
 Profile at soccerway.com

1983 births
Living people
Greek footballers
PAS Giannina F.C. players
Olympiacos Volos F.C. players
PAS Lamia 1964 players
Apollon Smyrnis F.C. players
Panachaiki F.C. players
Association football defenders
Footballers from Ioannina